Adolf Kittel (born 4 July 1902, date of death unknown) was a Czech middle-distance runner. He competed for Czechoslovakia in the men's 800 metres at the 1928 Summer Olympics.

References

External links
 
 

1902 births
Year of death missing
Athletes (track and field) at the 1928 Summer Olympics
Czech male middle-distance runners
Olympic athletes of Czechoslovakia
Place of birth missing